The Alexandria expedition of 1807, also known as the Fraser expedition, was a failed attempt by the British to capture the Egyptian city of Alexandria during the Anglo-Turkish War in order to secure a base of operations against the Ottoman Empire and the French Empire in the Mediterranean Sea. It was a part of a larger strategy against the Ottoman-French alliance of the Ottoman Sultan Selim III.

Though Alexandria was briefly captured and occupied, attempts to proceed inland were rebuffed, with British forces being twice defeated in battles at Rosetta (Rashid, the port that guarded the entrance to the Nile), at a cost of over 900 officers and men killed, and many captured at the second siege of Rosetta alone. Captured British soldiers were marched to Cairo, and were marched there between rows of stakes whereon were displayed many hundreds of the severed heads of their slain comrades. British captives were then condemned to hard-labour or were sold into slavery.

The remaining British forces in Egypt were forced to retreat to Alexandria, where they remained besieged unable to gather supplies. Using this trapped army and the numerous prisoners as a bargaining tool, Viceroy Muhammad Ali compelled the British commanders to cease further operations in Egypt. The British were then forced to embark their transports again, and leave Alexandria, not having gained any significant position of influence in Egypt or reached any specific goals towards influencing the Ottoman Empire's improving relations with France. In Egypt, the expedition had the effect of uniting the populace behind Muhammad Ali, who seized power in Egypt. It also had the effect of convincing the British government to support Egypt remaining as part of the Ottoman Empire.

Background

The Expedition began in mid-February 1807 when a force of British troops deployed in Calabria and Sicily was ordered by General Fox in Messina to embark on transports with a mission rumoured to be destined for Constantinople while John Thomas Duckworth, appointed second in command of the Mediterranean Fleet, sailed for Constantinople, but he failed to provide effective support for Dmitry Senyavin's Imperial Russian Navy in the Dardanelles Operation. After departure from Constantinople, as an Admiral of the White Squadron he was to rendezvous with the transports in Aboukir Bay. However, by 17 March the fleet of transports with nearly 6,000 British troops embarked on board approached off Alexandria under the command of General Alexander Mackenzie-Fraser.

Occupation of Alexandria

The appearance of the British transports off Alexandria was unexpected, and 20 March  was able to capture two Ottoman frigates, Uri Bahar (40 guns) and Uri Nasard (34 guns), and the corvette Fara Numa (16 guns) on 20 March.  , with nineteen other transports, had separated from the main force on 7 March. They did not participate during the initial landings.

The city garrison at this time consisted of Albanian troops, with the French Consul-General Bernandino Drovetti attempting to force them to repel the British landing west of the city. Despite the rough waves, almost 700 troops with five field guns, along with 56 seamen, commanded by Lieutenant James Boxer, were able to disembark without opposition near the ravine that runs from Lake Mareotis to the sea.  These troops breached the palisaded entrenchments at eight in the evening on 18 March. It was fortunate for the British that they did not encounter serious resistance because the lines stretching from Fort des Baines to Lake Mareotis included eight guns in three batteries, and thirteen guns in the fort on the right flank. British casualties were light; however the Pompey Gate (also known as the Pompey's Pillar), was barricaded and defended by about 1,000 Ottoman troops and armed volunteers, forcing British troops to set up camp to the south. Two detachments were sent to occupy Aboukir Castle, and the "Cut", Qaitbay Citadel, a castle in Alexandria between lakes Maadia and Mareotis. The detachment's mission was to prevent Ottoman reinforcements from reaching the city. The next day, 20 March, the rest of the transports appeared off Alexandria, and an Arab messenger was sent with an offer of capitulation that was accepted by the city authorities. Sir John Thomas Duckworth appeared on 22 March, off Alexandria in his flagship , with a part of his squadron, further bolstering the confidence of the British troops.

On the occupation of the city, Fraser and his staff first heard of the death of Muhammad Bey al-Alfi, upon whose co-operation they had founded their hopes of further success; and messengers were immediately despatched to his successor and other local Beys, inviting them to Alexandria. The British Resident, Major Missett, with support from Duckworth, was able to convince General Mackenzie-Fraser of the importance of occupying Rosetta (Reshee'd) and Rahmanieh (Er-Rahhma'nee'yeh) to secure supplies for Alexandria because they controlled the canal, by which supplies were brought to the city via the Nile.

Manoeuvring against Muhammad Ali
Muhammad Ali, meanwhile, was conducting an expedition against the Beys in Upper Egypt (he later defeated them near Assiut) when he heard of the arrival of the British. In great alarm lest the beys should join them, especially as they were far north of his position, he immediately sent messengers to his rivals.  Ali promised to comply with all the Beys demands if they should join his campaign against the British; this proposal being agreed to, both armies marched towards Cairo on opposite sides of the river.

Battle of Rosetta

On March 21, 1807 AD, the local Ottoman force in Rashid, led by its governor Ali Bey Al-Selaniki, confronted the advancing British troops led by General Fraser, two years after Muhammad Ali assumed power in Egypt. The British had arrived in Egypt during the struggles between the governor Muhammad Ali and the Mamluks. The British signed a treaty with Muhammad Bey Al-Alfy, the leader of the Mamluks, to ensure his support of the British campaign, in exchange for a British guarantee that the Mamluks would establish control over Egypt if the British expedition was successful. However, Al-Alfi died before this expedition reached Egypt.

The plan was for the Mamluks to march to Cairo to occupy it, while the British would capture several strategically important Egyptian ports, and then march to the Delta and occupy Cairo, provided that the Mamluks assisted their forces in Egypt, especially the Millennium Front.  General Fraser was in Alexandria, had received a report from the British Consul in Rashid on the state of Egypt and its forces, which made him march overland to Rashid to occupy it, and establish a military base for his forces, and assigned the commander "and is serving" this military mission.

500 troops of the 31st Foot and the Chasseurs Britanniques were detached, accompanied by a section of Royal Artillery, under Major-General Patrick Wauchope and Brigadier-General the Honorable Robert Meade

Wauchope moved in 2,500 soldiers from Alexandria to Rashid. The Governor of Rashid, Ali Bey Al-Selaniki, and his 700 soldiers, mustered to oppose the British advance, and Sheikh Hassan Crere mobilized the general public to support the Egyptian forces, so he ordered the removal of the Egyptian boats from the front of the Nile, Rashid, to the eastern bank opposite the Green Island and a spindle tower in the Moutoubis county, to prevent the people from getting over them and fleeing the city, so that his garrison men do not find a way to retreat, surrender or withdraw, as the Alexandria garrison did before.  The garrison among the people became concealed in the homes inside the city of Rashid, as in front of them would only be skirmishing, and ordered them not to move or fire unless after the issuance of an agreed signal, so the British advanced and did not find any Egyptian troops, so they believed that the city would surrender as the garrison of Alexandria did, so they entered the city's streets in safety and they took a rest after walking in the sand from Alexandria to Rashid, and spread in the streets of the city and markets to find places to take refuge and rest in.  They almost did not rest, until the call to the call to prayer issued by the Selaniki order was launched from the minaret of the Sidi Zaghloul mosque, chanting: “Allah Akbar! (God is great) For jihad!” Residents and Rashid's garrison fire broke out from the windows and rooftops, killing several British officers and soldiers; those who were not killed proceeded to retreat.

The British losses amounted to 185 dead, 282 wounded, and 120 captured at Rashid's garrison. Muhammad Ali arrived with his forces after the British withdrew to Alexandria. Muhammad Ali Pasha and General Fraser negotiated the withdrawal from Egypt and he left with the remaining British forces. September 19th, the date of the battle, became a national holiday in the Beheira province.

Battle of Al Hammad 

The Battle of Al-Hammad, one of the battles of the Fraser Campaign, took place on April 21, 1807 between the British forces led by General Fraser and the Ottoman forces led by Muhammad Ali Pasha near the village of Al-Hammad in the lake. The British proved unable to prevent Ottoman cavalry from outflanking them.

The Battle of Rashid was a severe defeat for the British expedition. The British casualties amounted to 185 dead, 282 wounded, and 120 captives at Rashid's garrison. General Fraser, the leader of the campaign, wanted to erase the impact of his defeat in that battle. He intended to equip another army that resumed marching towards Rashid and pledged to lead it to  General Stuart. Meanwhile, Muhammad Ali Pasha arrived in Cairo, returning from Upper Egypt, and he reached it on the night of April 12, 1807 (3 Safar in 1222 AH). He was briefed on the news received about the defeat of the British in Rashid, so he was reassured by a little but did not depend on what happened on that battle and saw with insight that the British may resume their march to Rashid given the fact that it was not heavily defended, so he mobilized an army to fight them and prevent them from any progress, and his men completed the fortifying works that began with him before his presence, and he continued working in digging trenches between Bab Al-Hadid and Bulaq to establish a defence line from Cairo from the north and cutting grooves in front of the trenches connected to the Nile to fill  With water and obstructed the progress of the British troops, and scuttled several boats between the island of Bulaq and the beach to prevent the passage of British ships in the Nile if they came from Rashid, and the installation of cannons in Shubra and Imbaba and the island of Bulaq, and the scholars and local people participated in work with them.

He managed to get the money needed for the army's expenses, and Umar Makram and the scholars helped him collect the money so he could manage, so they collected nine hundred bags of gold from the capital's residents, which they allocated for the expenses of advance. The campaign was prepared, and it consisted of 4,000 infantry fighters, 1,500 horsemen, they marched to Rashid, led by Tabuzoglu. As for General Stuart's army, it numbered about four thousand soldiers equipped with artillery, various types of firearms and ammunition. This army moved from Alexandria on April 3, advancing against Rashid, and when it became close to it, a battalion occupied Al-Hammad, which is located south of Rashid between the Nile and Lake Idku, and the purpose of its occupation was to encircling Rashid, preventing the city's garrison from being reinforced with supplies from the south and securing local sources of water for the British. The British also captured Akam Abi Mandour, and installed cannons near the village to bombard Rashid. Most of the army was camped west and south of Rashid, and surrounded it (April 7) and bombard it with artillery.

The British commanders assumed that a continued bombardment would cause a loss of morale among the city's garrison and compel them to surrender. The British dispatched a messenger to the city, informing them that if the demand of surrender was refused a naval and land bombardment would commence. The Egyptian's prior victory at the Battle of Rashid had convinced them of the futility of a possible British bombardment, which commenced soon after the return of the messenger to the British forces. The garrison occasionally left the city during the bombardment to skirmish with the British troops encamped on land, and the bombardment lasted for twelve days but was unable to achieve any results, and the city remained in Egyptian hands.

The British were waiting for the Mamluks to find them, but these people were shrewd and procrastinated in fulfilling their pledge, and watched the development of situation, and then abandoned their allies when they saw the embarrassment of their position. In the meantime, the villagers took to the British positions in Al-Hammad, and General Stuart sent out a number of soldiers, and the Egyptians also installed artillery on the eastern shore and began bombarding the British army's positions on the western mainland. 250 British soldiers managed to capture the Egyptian positions and the artillery, then the Egyptians were halted for a period of time so MacDonald returned to the mainland.

The fighting and the siege continued until the time sent by Muhammad Ali Pasha, led by Tabuzoglu, came, and the war situation changed substantially. Tabuzoglu's force was composed of two divisions, the first was infantry led by Tabuzoglu himself on the eastern mainland of the Nile, and the other was cavalry led by Hassan Pasha on the western mainland, and the two divisions were moving on the road of the two beaches, when they came close to Rashid, the forces of Hassan Pasha on the western mainland was facing Al-Hammad, and the other was camped in Barnbal in the eastern beach. The soldiers of the two divisions were able to see each other.

On the morning of April 20, the Egyptian army's advance guards from the cavalry (Hassan Pasha's division) advanced toward the British positions in Al-Hammad, and met a battalion among them among the farms, the battalion wanted to retreat to the village, but they did not rule their withdrawal and were surrounded by Egyptian army Cavalry, and some were killed while others were captured others, so when he knew General Stuart's situation, with this first collision, sent Colonel Patrick Macleod, along with a number of soldiers and cannons, to Al-Hammad to establish forward positions fortified with artillery, and he was entrusted with commanding the force stationed with it.

The location of this village was of great importance, and on it the axis of the fighting revolves because it is located in the isthmus between the Nile and Lake Idku, and in the north there is a canal that was then dry, reaching from the Nile to the near of the lake. If the British had tightened the defense of their position there, they could block the road in front of the Egyptian army, so they cannot pass that isthmus, nor can he reach Rashid to provide relief.

The colonels arranged the positions of his soldiers to defend them this isthmus, and their number was eight hundred fighters whose facilitation is based on the Nile under the command of the Major Wigsland, and their direction near Lake Idku led by Captain Tarleton, and the heart in the village of Al-Hammad led by Major Moore, and the majority of the British army were linked around Rashid to besiege it.

It passed on April 20 and the British site in Al-Hammad was not targeted by the Egyptian forces, and Colonel Macleod was assured of his position, but General Stuart inevitably noticed the impact of the defence line in Al-Hammad (the night of April 21) that it was not possible in some of his destinations to pressure the Egyptian army if its number increased. Then, he entrusted Colonel Macleod to take a courage to defend his positions as much as he could, and in the event of the proliferation of Egyptian cavalry forces, he had to return to the original British positions around Rashid.

General Stuart realized that the Egyptian forces, after reaching them, had become more numerous than the British army, so he decided to wait until the next day (21 April), and if the Mamluk help did not reach him, he would withdraw from the Al Hammad, lift the siege on Rashid and retreat to Alexandria.

As for Tabuzoglu, the Egyptian army commander, he was at that time stationed in Barnabal on the eastern mainland, hesitating on which path to take, would he go straight to the rescue of Rashid to lift the siege on it, or would he first attack the British position in Al-Hammad, until he was encouraged by the victory that the Cavalry of Hassan Pasha achieved on the western mainland in the first collision, so he intended to follow the last plan. He crossed the Nile at night with his soldiers, and the boats transported them to the left enemy, and they joined the Hassan Pasha contingent in preparation to attack Al-Hammad in the morning of 21 April.

In the morning, Colonel Macleod watched the Egyptian army forces multiply their number, and the plain was filled with men, so he immediately sent to General Stuart the news foretells him and asked him to decide to withdraw to the British army's positions around Rashid, so he sent him a message, approving his plan, and sent it with a platoon of soldiers, but the messenger did not reach Al-Hammad, because the Egyptian army's cavalry descended on the plain and cut off the transportation between Al-Hammad and Rashid, so Macleod intended to withdraw from his defence line, but he did not rule his plan, and his forces were dispersed, so the Egyptian army cavalry managed to pounce on them one by one, while the Egyptian infantry occupied the village of Al-Hammad.

The Cavalry tracked down the three forces, and surrounded them from every direction, killing most of its men and including Colonel Macleod himself. They also surrounded the right flank, killing its commander Captain Tarleton and most of its soldiers, and those who survived were taken in captivity and numbered 50 men.

As for the British left flank, it resisted a little but was surrounded by cavalrymen from all sides. Its commander, Major Wigsland seemed to surrender, so he and the rest of the British surrendered, and that was the end of the battle. The battle started at seven in the morning. It lasted three hours during which the fighting broke out, and it ended with the defeat of the British army stationed in Al-Hammad, and no one survived it. Those who did not die in fighting couldn't escape from captivity, and their losses reached about 416 dead and 400 prisoners.

General Stuart was stationed during the battle south of Rashid and with the rest of the British army. When he realized the greatness of the catastrophe that had befallen his forces in Al-Hammad, he quickly lifted the siege on Rashid and took the initiative to withdraw before the Egyptian army attacked him. He spiked his cannons that he could not carry and retreated to Abu Qir in disappointment. In spite of concealing the withdrawal measures, the people of Rashid and the neighbouring towns harassed him in his withdrawal until he reached Lake Idku and skirmishes took place on the shore of the lake between him and the Egyptians, which ended in the retreat of the Egyptian skirmishers; despite this, the British continued to withdraw until they reached Abu Qir and from there they boarded waiting Royal Navy ships and sailed back to Alexandria.

Siege of Alexandria
The defeat at Rosetta forced Mackenzie-Fraser to reconsider his position, and British troops were ordered to reoccupy Alexandria which was soon besieged by the Egyptian and Mamluk troops from Cairo. Using his feigned good will as a pretext, Muhammad Ali then offered the British the freedom to receive supplies from Duckworth's transports as well as a grain trade agreement with an added assurances of security for any trade routes to India in return for recognition of his independence from the Ottoman Empire. The grain agreement was accepted, and supplies continued to be delivered to the British troops in Alexandria.  However, formal recognition of independence was not given by the British government, which had no intention of seeing the Ottoman Empire dismantled in the face of an expansionist Russia.

Departure from Alexandria
Colonel Dravetti, now advising Muhammad Ali in Cairo, was able to persuade the ruler to release the British prisoners of war as a good will gesture, sparing them the usual fate of becoming slaves to their captors. In September, when no further use could be gained from occupation of Alexandria, General Mackenzie-Fraser was permitted to surrender the city and withdraw to Sicily on the 25th.

Expedition Order of Battle

Royal Navy
HMS Royal George (100 guns) Vice-Admiral Duckworth (flag), Captain Richard Dalling Dunn
HMS Canopus (80 guns)
HMS Repulse (74 guns)
 (74 guns)
HMS Thunderer (74 guns)
 (74 guns) Captain Benjamin Hallowell>
HMS Apollo (38 guns) Captain Fellowes
HMS Wizard brig-sloop (16 guns) Captain Palmer
33 transports

British Army
detachment, Royal Staff Corps
detachment, Royal Artillery
detachment, Royal Engineers Sir John Burgoyne
3rd Squadron, 20th Light Dragoons
31st Regiment of Foot
1st Battalion, 35th Regiment of Foot
2nd Battalion, 35th Regiment of Foot
2nd Battalion, 78th Regiment of Foot
Roll's Regiment
Chasseurs Britanniques
Sicilian Regiment
Adjutant General's Department
Commissariat
Hospital Staff
Pay Master General's Department
Quarter Master General's Department

See also
 Muhammad Ali's seizure of power

Notes

References

Citations

Sources
 Alsager Pollock, Arthur William, (ed.), The United Service Magazine, Notes of an Expedition to Alexandria of the year 1807, H. Colburn [etc.], 1837
 Scott, Walter, The Life of Napoleon Buonaparte, Emperor of the French: With a Preliminary View of the French Revolution, vol.II, Carey, Lea & Carey, Philadelphia, 1827
 The Monthly Magazine; or British Register, Vol.XXIII, Part I for 1807, July 1, Richard Phillips, London
 The Literary Panorama, Vol.II, Letter from Major General [Mackenzie-]Fraser to Viscount Castlereagh, London, Charles Taylor, 1807
 Manley, Deborah & Ree, Peta, Henry Salt: Artist, Traveller, Diplomat, Egyptologist, Libri Publications Ltd., 2001
 
 Hart, H.G., Captain 49th Regiment, The New Annual Army Lists for 1848, Ninth annual volume, containing the dates of Commissions, and  statement of the war services and wounds of nearly every officer in the Army, Ordnance and Marines, John Murray, London, 1848 (includes Militia List, and Imperial Yeomanry List)
 Russell, William & Jones, William, The History of Modern Europe: With a View of the Progress of Society from the Rise of the Modern Kingdoms to the Peace of Paris, in 1763, Vol.III, Harper & brothers, New York, 1839
 Bell, James, A System of Geography, Popular and Scientific: Or A Physical, Political, and Statistical Account of the World and Its Various Divisions, Vol.III, Archibald Fullarton and Co., Glasgow, 1832
 Hassan, Hassan & Fernea, Robert, In the House of Muhammad Ali: A Family Album, 1805-1952, American University in Cairo Press, 2000
  Lane, Edward William & Thompson, Jason, Description of Egypt: Notes and Views in Egypt and Nubia, Made During the Years 1825, -26, -27, and -28 ..., American University in Cairo Press, 2000
 James, William, Naval history of Great Britain, Vol. IV, 
 
 Yeo, Richard R., The Edinburgh Encyclopaedia, Routledge, 1999

Campaigns of the Napoleonic Wars
1807 in Egypt
Egypt–United Kingdom relations
Military expeditions
Expeditions from the United Kingdom
Naval battles involving Ottoman Egypt
19th-century military history of the United Kingdom
Wars of Muhammad Ali of Egypt